Nasha Versija ("Our Version") is a Moscow-based Russian weekly tabloid founded in 1998 by Artyom Borovik, nowadays owned by Nikolai Zyatkov, former editor-in-chief of Argumenty I Fakty newspaper. Weekly print circulation of 170 000 in March 2017. The newspaper adheres to the generally accepted standards of investigative journalism.

In 2005 the newspaper received a new logo Nasha Versija (previous – Versija). The same year, Rodionov publishing house tried to buy a popular newspaper from Veronika Borovik-Khiltchevskaya, Borovik's widow, but the ownership finally changed in 2007. The new owner became Nikolai Zyatkov.

Those who worked and contributed to Nasha Versia:

Leonid Radzikhovsky - a political analyst and independent journalist,
Orkhan Jamal – prominent investigative journalist,
Rustam Arifdjanov – second after Artyom Borovik editor-in-chief, nowadays representative of the Council of Elders of the Federal National-Cultural Autonomy of Azerbaijanis of Russia,
Oleg Lurje – investigative journalist, author of scandalous publications about the activities of the Bank of New York, Mabetex and Roman Abramovich.
Konstantin Zyatkov - CEO and editor-in-chief of internet site since May 2008,
Alexander Sinistchuk is the editor-in-chief of printed edition since May 2013.

Nasha Versija has a number of regional joint projects:

 Nasha Versia on the Neva - regional publishing project in Saint Petersburg,
 Nasha Versia in Saratov,
 Nasha Versia in the Republic of Bashkortostan

References

Newspapers published in Moscow
Newspapers established in 1998
Weekly newspapers published in Russia
1998 establishments in Russia